Abraham "Bambol" Ng Tolentino (born February 23, 1964) is a Filipino politician who currently serves as the Mayor of Tagaytay and President of the Philippine Olympic Committee. He previously served as representative of Cavite's 8th district from 2019 to 2022 and the 7th district from 2013 to 2019.

Political career
In 1998, he was elected as City Councilor of Tagaytay and served until 2004. He ran for Mayor in 2004 and won; he was re-elected in 2007 and 2010. In 2013, he defeated Gilbert Remulla as Congressman of the newly-created 7th district of Cavite. He was re-elected in 2016 and in 2019, this time at the newly-created 8th district.

His other positions include:
 Member - Commission of Appointments
 Vice Chairman - Committee of Agrarian Reform
 Chairman - Committee of Agriculture and Food
 Vice Chairman - Committee of National Defense
 Vice Chairman - Committee of Rules and Resolutions

Tolentino also serves as the President of the Philippine Olympic Committee since 2019. On July 10, 2020, Tolentino is one of the 70 representatives who voted to "yes" to deny the franchise renewal of ABS-CBN. On December 16, he was named as one of the Deputy Speakers of the House of Representatives.

Tolentino, being term-limited as representative, ran for Mayor of Tagaytay in 2022 and won, running unopposed.

Personal life
Tolentino had his primary education at the St. Augustine School, Mendez, Cavite, and his secondary education at the St. Anthony School, Manila. He finished his Bachelor of Science in Commerce (Major in Management) at San Beda College (now San Beda University) and his Master of Science in Fiscal Studies at the Lyceum of the Philippines. Tolentino took an Executive Course on Leadership, Chaos, Conflict & Courage for the 21st Century at the John F. Kennedy School of Government, Harvard University and Executive Course on National Security at the Institute for Extramural and Continuing Studies, National Defense College of the Philippines.

He is the youngest of the two sons of Atty. Isaac O. Tolentino, who was the longest-serving mayor of Tagaytay. He is the brother of Francis Tolentino, also a former mayor of Tagaytay and incumbent senator.

He married Dr. Agnes Delgado Tolentino, the former mayor of Tagaytay. They have three children. Their eldest daughter, Aniela Bianca, is the incumbent representative of the 8th district of Cavite. Their second daughter, Athena Bryana, is the incumbent vice governor of Cavite.

He is a Past Grand Master of the Free & Accepted Masons of the Philippines.

He also served as the Secretary-General of FIDE/World Chess Organization, President of ASEAN Chess Zone 3.3, Secretary-General of the National Chess Federation of the Philippines, and is currently the President of Philcycling.

References

1964 births
Filipino politicians of Chinese descent
Living people
PDP–Laban politicians
National Unity Party (Philippines) politicians
Liberal Party (Philippines) politicians
United Nationalist Alliance politicians
Place of birth missing (living people)
Members of the House of Representatives of the Philippines from Cavite
Mayors of places in Cavite
People from Tagaytay
Filipino city and municipal councilors
Filipino Freemasons
Filipino sports executives and administrators